White Oak Creek (shown on federal maps as Whiteoak Creek) is a  tributary of the Tennessee River in Middle Tennessee in the United States. The area of the creek around the span of the Magnolia Bridge is a popular public park.

See also
List of rivers of Tennessee

References

Rivers of Tennessee
Tributaries of the Tennessee River
Bodies of water of Houston County, Tennessee